John Angus Kirk (March 1, 1837 – September 13, 1910) was a Canadian politician and farmer. He was elected to the House of Commons of Canada as a Member of the Liberal Party to represent the riding of Guysborough. He was defeated in 1878 and re-elected in 1882 and 1887.

He was the son of Angus Kirk, of Scottish descent. He was educated in Glenelg and at Saint Francis Xavier University and became a farmer in Guysborough County. Kirk was a councillor for St. Mary's, Nova Scotia and a member of the Canadian military as a Lieutenant-Colonel in the 5th Guysborough Regiment of Militia. He represented Guysborough County in the Nova Scotia House of Assembly from 1867 to 1874, when he resigned his seat to run for a seat in the House of Commons.

He was married twice: to Sarah Susannah McLean in 1864 and later married a Miss Henry.

Electoral record

References

External links 
 

1837 births
1910 deaths
Nova Scotia Liberal Party MLAs
Liberal Party of Canada MPs
Members of the House of Commons of Canada from Nova Scotia